Homogyna is a genus of moths in the family Sesiidae.

Species
Homogyna alluaudi  Le Cerf, 1911
Homogyna bartschi de Freina, 2011
Homogyna ignivittata  Hampson, 1919
Homogyna pythes (Druce, 1899)
Homogyna sanguicosta  Hampson, 1919
Homogyna sanguipennis (Meyrick, 1926)
Homogyna xanthophora (Hampson, 1910)
Homogyna pygmaea (Rebel, 1899)
Homogyna endopyra (Hampson, 1910)
Homogyna spadicicorpus  Prout, 1919

References

Sesiidae